Jabbi Shareef , is one of the 51 Union Councils (administrative subdivisions) of Khushab District in the Punjab Province of Pakistan is located at 12 km North of Mitha Tiwana Station at main Sargodha Mianwali Road . It is oldest city of the district and one of the oldest cities of Punjab. It belongs to Daman-e-Muhar region and it is the largest city of Daman-e-Muhar. It has Awan (Gaji khanal Awan) as its major cast. Sayd (Gilani and Hamdani) are also settled here. Population of Jabbi Shareef is about 40,503 and is divided into three regions,

Jabbi-Janubi,    (Population : 645)

rakh Jabbi. (Population :5010)

Jabbi-Shumali,  (Population : 35493)

It is a hilly and plain area. The mountains of this region are rich in pink salt. There is also a natural spring here which is known as Mahla in the local language. The water in this spring is very clear and sweet.The fountain has been here since ancient times and is built according to the old style of construction. The water is accessed by going down the stairs.

It covers a vast land of 90 km2. It is located at 32°23'60N 72°5'60E.

References

pbs.gov.pk/content/block-wise-provisional-summary-results-6th-population-housing-census-2017-january-03-2018

Union councils of Khushab District